Muckross Abbey (Irish: Mainistir Locha Léin and Mainistir Mhucrois) is one of the major ecclesiastical sites, found in the Killarney National Park, County Kerry, Ireland. It was founded in 1448 as a Franciscan friary for the Observantine Franciscans by Donal McCarthy Mor. 

It has had a violent history and has been damaged and reconstructed many times. The friars were often subjected to raids by marauding groups and were persecuted by Cromwellian forces under Lord Ludlow.  Today the abbey is largely roofless although, apart from this, is generally quite well preserved. Its most striking feature is a central courtyard, which contains a large yew tree and is surrounded by a vaulted cloister.

In the 17th and 18th centuries, it became the burial place for prominent County Kerry poets O'Donoghue, Ó Rathaille and Ó Súilleabháin, while Piaras Feiritéar is buried in the graveyard just outside.

Gallery

See also
 Muckross House
 List of abbeys and priories in Ireland (County Kerry)

References

External links

Franciscan monasteries in the Republic of Ireland
1448 establishments in Ireland
Roman Catholic churches in County Kerry
Religious organizations established in the 1440s
Ruins in the Republic of Ireland
Christian monasteries established in the 15th century
National Monuments in County Kerry